
Year 823 (DCCCXXIII) was a common year starting on Thursday (link will display the full calendar) of the Julian calendar.

Events 
 By place 

 Byzantine Empire 
 Emperor Michael II defeats the rebel forces under Thomas the Slav in Thrace. He and his supporters are forced to seek refuge in Arkadiopolis (modern Turkey). After five months of blockade, Thomas surrenders and is delivered to Michael, seated on a donkey and bound in chains. He pleads for clemency and prostrates before Michael, but is executed.

 Europe 
 April 5 – Lothair I, eldest son of Emperor Louis I, is crowned co-emperor again by Pope Paschal I at Rome (initiating the papal practice of handing the imperial sword over, as a symbol of temporal power in the Holy Roman Empire).

 Britain 
 King Ceolwulf I of Mercia is deposed by Beornwulf, who takes the throne of Mercia. During his rule he rebuilds the Abbey of St. Peter, and presides over two synods at Clofesho.

 Japan 
 May 30 – Emperor Saga abdicates the throne, after a 10-year reign. He is succeeded by his brother Junna, as the 53rd emperor of Japan.

Births 
 June 13 – Charles the Bald, king of the Franks (d. 877)
 Ermentrude of Orléans, queen of the Franks (d. 869)
 Muhammad I, Muslim emir of Córdoba (d. 886)
 Pepin II (the Younger), king of Aquitaine

Deaths 
 Adelochus, archbishop of Strasbourg (b. 786)
 Boniface I, margrave of Tuscany
 Ceolwulf I, king of Mercia (approximate date)
 Gondulphus, bishop of Metz
 Han Hong, general of the Tang Dynasty b. 765)
 Ljudevit, duke of the Slavs in Lower Pannonia
 Thekla, Byzantine empress (approximate date)
 Thomas the Slav, Byzantine general and usurper
 Timothy I, Syrian patriarch
 Wulfheard, bishop of Hereford (approximate date)

References